Nick Constantine Maniatty better known by his mononym Nicco is an American singer, songwriter with pop, Europop, dance, reggae, house and electronic influences. He was signed to Sony in April 2011 and released his debut single "Downpour" in August 2011. His continuous growing success in the Euro-dance scene led to
his international hit "Party Shaker" with R.I.O. that made it to the Top Ten in Austria, Germany and Switzerland and became a Top 40 hit in both France and the Netherlands.

Career
Nicco was influenced from a very young age with reggae music while spending summers working in St. John U.S. Virgin Islands where his family lives. After collaborating with European dance producers, he became popular with European night clubs, particularly after collaborating with a number of European artists, most notably with Austrian DJs Darius & Finlay starting 2009 appearing in a number of mixes and recordings and making an impact in Austria and Germany with recordings like "Do It All Night" and "Destination" released by Trak Music and "Rock to the Beat", "Hold On" and "Till Morning" released by Sony Germany. He also collaborated with Polish producer and DJ Robert M. in "Dance Hall Track" that was a hit in Poland and was certified gold. He came back in 2012 with a new version of "Do It All Night" with Darius & Finlay featuring Zimbabwe-born German rapper Carlprit and Nicco. Nicco recently collaborated with R.I.O, as the voice of "Party Shaker", R.I.O.feat. Nicco, allowing him to broaden his international presence.

Style
Nicco molded his craft over the years and during his studies at Northeastern University in Boston Massachusetts. He moved to Queens, New York where he was singing and performing Dance-hall Reggae and Soca music in many of the well known Caribbean clubs in Brooklyn, New York. In the past 10 years Nicco has used his reggae influences to fuse both his vocals and rough chanting to formulate a new sound.

Awards / Nominations
 2009: Won "Most Played Song of the Year 2009" at Polish FaMa Award for "Destination" (Darius & Finlay feat. Nicco)
 2010: Won "Best Artist" and "Best Newcomer" at the Austrian Music Awards after nomination in 3 categories
 2010: prlog/>

Discography
Solo
 2011: "Downpour" [Sony]

As Darius & Finlay featuring Nicco
 2009: "Destination" [album]
 2009: "Do It All Night" [album – Zoo Digital]
 2009: "Rock to the Beat" [CD / Maxi single – Trak Music]
 2010: "Hold On" [Single – Ariola / Sony Music]
 2011: "Till Morning" [CD / Single Sony Music]
 2015: "Firestarter" [CD / Maxi single – Trak Music]

As Darius & Finlay featuring Carlprit & Nicco
 2012: "Do It All Night (2k12 version)"

As Nicco & Dank
 2013: "Into The Light" [Scorpio Music]

Featuring

 2008: "Can't Slow Down" (Robert M feat. Nicco)
 2009: "Destination" (The Rudenko Project feat. Nicco) [Single] 
 2009: "Hold Tight" (Chris Decay feat. Nicco) [EP, Klubbhouse Records]
 2009: "Can't Slow Down" (Bastian Bates feat. Nicco) [EP,  – Can't Slow Down]
 2009: "When We Dance" (DJ Pedro & Stephan M feat. Nicco) [Musica Diaz Toro]
 2009: "Put Ur Hands Up" (Wet Fingers with Nicco) [Single, Pozytyaka Sound]
 2010: "Dance Hall Track" (Tom Mountain feat. Nicco) [album, High5 Records]
 2010: "Dance Hall Track" (Robert M. feat. Nicco) [Loco Label Music]
 2011: "Run it back" ('N Luv & Movetown ft. Nicco)

References

External links
Official website
Facebook
Twitter
YouTube
Discogs
Last.fm

1977 births
Living people
People from Greenfield, Massachusetts
21st-century American singers
21st-century American male singers